Walter Stewart Owen,  (January 26, 1904 – January 13, 1981) was the 22nd Lieutenant Governor of British Columbia from 1973–1978.

In his youth, Owen was the first premier of the British Columbia Older Boys' Parliament, which later became the British Columbia Youth Parliament. He became a prominent lawyer in Vancouver. He was called to the Bar of British Columbia  in 1928 and in 1933 was named the youngest crown prosecutor in Canada at that time. He later went into private practice and co-founded the Vancouver law firm Owen Bird. In 1958, he was elected as the president of the Canadian Bar Association.

In 1956, Owen and business partner Frank Griffiths purchased New Westminster radio station CKNW and co-founded Western International Communications Ltd. ("WIC").

He is the father of Philip Owen, who served three terms as the mayor of the city of Vancouver.

In 1978, he was made an Officer of the Order of Canada.

References

External links
Biography from the website of the Lieutenant Governor of British Columbia

Lieutenant Governors of British Columbia
Lawyers in British Columbia
Canadian King's Counsel
Canadian Bar Association Presidents
20th-century Canadian businesspeople
Officers of the Order of Canada
1904 births
1981 deaths
People from the Regional District of Kitimat–Stikine